Barranger is a surname. Notable people with the surname include:
 Charly Barranger, French music producer
 Todd Barranger (born 1968), American golfer

See also 
 Barringer